Asunción Lavrin (born 1935 in Havana, Cuba) is a historian and author with more than 100 publications on topics of gender and women's studies in colonial and contemporary Latin America and religion and spirituality in Colonial Mexico. She is professor emerita at Arizona State University. Lavrin is the daughter-in-law of the artist Nora Fry Lavrin. She has two children, Cecilia and Andy, and two grand children, Erik and Nora.

Education and academic career
After entering the US for a Master of Arts at Radcliffe College (completed in 1958), Lavrin completed her PhD dissertation at Harvard University in 1963, entitled: "Religious Life of Mexican Women in the XVIII Century".  Lavrin was in the first cohort of women who received a doctorate from the Harvard Graduate School of Arts and Sciences.

Publications
Lavrin has published extensively on women in Latin America, especially on women in Mexico.  She has contributed significantly to the history of Roman Catholicism in Mexico, beginning with a number of her early articles drew on her dissertation on nuns and nunneries, culminating in her 2008 monograph Brides of Christ. Conventual Life in Colonial Mexico (Stanford, 2008)  She also addressed issues of elite secular women in colonial Mexico, including their economic roles as seen in her co-authored work on dowries and wills of women in Mexico City and Guadalajara. She also has interests in more general topics of colonial Mexican economic history in her analysis of the 1804 Law of Consolidation, where the crown called for mortgages, mostly held by religious institutions, to be redeemed immediately and the monies paid to Spanish treasury.

Her interest in women's history is wide-ranging, with her monograph on women in Argentina, women in Chile, and women in Uruguay in the modern era culminating in the monograph Women, Feminism and Social Change: Argentina, Chile and Uruguay, 1890–1940 (Nebraska Press, 1995). A review of this work by Virginia Leonard notes "Asunción Lavrin is ... a pioneer in Latin American women's history.  ... The publication of this book marks a watershed for Latin American studies: It is difficult to conceive that there will be any more books on politics and political parties in the Southern Cone that ignore women and feminist issues."

Lavrin has also edited several books, including the 2006 volume co-edited with Rosalva Loreto, Diálogos espirituales: Letras Femeninas Hispanoamericanas, Siglos XVI–XIX, and Latin American Women: Historical Perspectives (Greenwood Press, 1978).  As a senior editor of The Oxford Encyclopedia of Women in World History (Oxford, 2008), Lavrin also wrote twenty-one entries.

Lavrin worked as senior editor of the four volume Historia de las mujeres en España y América Latina (Cátedra, 2006), to which she contributed two chapters.

Awards and academic distinctions
Lavrin has received many awards for her contributions to the fields of history, women's studies, and gender studies, including 'Corresponding Member of the Academia Mexicana de la Historia' in 2011.

In 2008, Lavrin received the highest honor from the Conference on Latin American History (CLAH), the organization of Latin American historians affiliated with the American Historical Association, as the recipient of CLAH Distinguished Service Award. It is conferred to recognize the awardee's "career in scholarship, teaching, publishing, librarianship, institutional development or other fields demonstrates significant contributions to the advancement of the study of Latin American history in the United States."

Lavrin was also awarded two grants from the National Endowment for the Humanities, and from 2002- 2003, the John Simon Guggenheim grant. During 2001 and 2002 she held the position of President of the Conference on Latin American History (CLAH).

In honor of Professor Lavrin and Adolph Bandelier, the Rocky Mountain Council for Latin American Studies (RMCLAS) now annually awards the Bandelier/Lavrin Award for the Best Book in Colonial Latin American History. Lavrin is pictured on the RMCLAS website with the first winner, Ann Twinam (2016). According to the official website, the award is "named to honor two pioneers in the history of the Spanish American empire, the first working in the early days of the field [Bandelier], the second who forged a path in colonial history and served as a model for female historians in the profession [Lavrin]." She was American Academy of Arts and Sciences Fellow of 2019.

References

20th-century Cuban historians
Historians of Mexico
Historians of Latin America
Latin Americanists
American women historians
Women's historians
Feminist historians
American historians of religion
Social historians
1935 births
Living people
Radcliffe College alumni
Howard University faculty
Arizona State University faculty
21st-century American women writers
21st-century Cuban historians